The following highways are numbered 39. For a list of roads called N39, see List of N39 roads.

Australia
 Newell Highway
  Goulburn Valley Highway
 
Gore Highway
Leichhardt Highway

Canada
 Alberta Highway 39
 British Columbia Highway 39
 Manitoba Highway 39
 Ontario Highway 39
 Saskatchewan Highway 39

Costa Rica
 National Route 39

Czech Republic
 I/39 Highway; Czech: Silnice I/39

France
  A39 autoroute

India
  National Highway 39 (India)

Iran
 Road 39

Japan
 Japan National Route 39
 Asahikawa-Mombetsu Expressway

Korea, South
 National Route 39
Gukjido 39

New Zealand
 New Zealand State Highway 39

United Kingdom
 British A39 (Falmouth-Corston)

United States
 Interstate 39
 Alabama State Route 39
 Arkansas Highway 39
 California State Route 39
 Colorado State Highway 39
 Connecticut Route 39
 Florida State Road 39
 County Road 39 (Citrus County, Florida)
 County Road 39A (Citrus County, Florida)
 County Road 39 (Hillsborough County, Florida)
 County Road 39 (Manatee County, Florida)
 Georgia State Route 39
 Idaho State Highway 39
 Illinois Route 39 (former)
 Indiana State Road 39
 Iowa Highway 39
 K-39 (Kansas highway)
 Kentucky Route 39
 Louisiana Highway 39
 Louisiana State Route 39
 Maryland Route 39
Maryland Route 39A
 Massachusetts Route 39
 M-39 (Michigan highway)
 Minnesota State Highway 39
 County Road 39 (Chisago County, Minnesota)
 County Road 39 (Hennepin County, Minnesota)
 Mississippi Highway 39
 Missouri Route 39
 Montana Highway 39
 Nebraska Highway 39
 Nevada State Route 39 (former)
 New Jersey Route 39 (former)
 County Route 39 (Bergen County, New Jersey)
 County Route 39 (Monmouth County, New Jersey)
 County Route 39 (Ocean County, New Jersey)
 New Mexico State Road 39
 New York State Route 39
 County Route 39 (Dutchess County, New York)
 County Route 39 (Erie County, New York)
 County Route 39 (Genesee County, New York)
 County Route 39 (Oswego County, New York)
 County Route 39 (Rensselaer County, New York)
 County Route 39 (Saratoga County, New York)
 County Route 39 (Schoharie County, New York)
 County Route 39 (St. Lawrence County, New York)
 County Route 39 (Suffolk County, New York)
 County Route 39A (Suffolk County, New York)
 County Route 39B (Suffolk County, New York)
 County Route 39 (Warren County, New York)
 County Route 39 (Wyoming County, New York)
 County Route 39 (Yates County, New York)
 North Carolina Highway 39
 North Dakota Highway 39 (former)
 Ohio State Route 39
 Oklahoma State Highway 39
 Oregon Route 39
 Pennsylvania Route 39
 South Carolina Highway 39
 Tennessee State Route 39
 Texas State Highway 39
 Texas State Highway Loop 39 (former)
 Texas State Highway Spur 39 (former)
 Texas Park Road 39
 Farm to Market Road 39
 Utah State Route 39
 Virginia State Route 39
 Virginia State Route 39 (1923–1933) (former)
 Virginia State Route 39 (1933-1940) (former)
 West Virginia Route 39
 Wisconsin Highway 39

Territories
 Puerto Rico Highway 39
 U.S. Virgin Islands Highway 39

Uruguay
  Route 39 Domingo Burgueño

See also
A39 (disambiguation)#Roads